Neville High School is a high school in Monroe, Louisiana, United States. It is administered by the Monroe City Schools Board. It is located 1/2 mile from the Ouachita River. Its mascot is the Tiger.

Academics
Neville offers a wide variety of academics, on and off campus. Neville has a Technology department, English department, Foreign Language department, Health department, Journalism department, Math department, Naval Science department, Science department, Social Studies department, and Special Service department.

Technology
The Neville High School Business Department is dedicated to developing and improving workplace skills for students.  By doing so, this will enable them to meet the demands of the workplace, make viable career choices, and become information-literate in order to communicate effectively, make decisions, and solve problems in today's fast-paced economy. In conjunction with Louisiana Technical College, our department offers dual enrollment college credit in the following areas:  Financial Math and Keyboarding, as well as opportunities to receive industry-based certifications in CIW and IC3.

Athletics
Neville High athletics competes in the LHSAA.

Football
The Neville Tigers play football at Bill Ruple Stadium in Monroe, Louisiana and are coached by Head Coach Jeff Tannehill. 

Neville has won 12 state championships (1955, 1959, 1961, 1962, 1972, 1983, 1984, 1995, 2009, 2011, 2014, 2015) and have been state runners-up six times (1958, 1982, 1991, 1992, 2012, 2016). The Tigers have claimed a district championship 29 times. Neville has made a football playoff appearance 53 times. The Tigers have not missed the playoffs since 1999. The Tigers have had 6 perfect seasons in its football history (1959, 1961, 1962, 1983, 2011, 2015). From 2014 to 2016, the Neville Tigers won 39 straight football games, marking it the 7th best streak in LHSAA history.

In 2002, Robert Lane was named Louisiana High School Gatorade Player of the Year, making him the only Tiger to ever receive this honor. Both Robert Lane (2002) and John Diarse (2012) were named LSWA Mr. Football for Louisiana. Diarse was also named a Parade All-American and a U.S. Army All-American.

Coaches
 Charlie Brown - LHSAA Hall of Fame Head Coach, Charlie Brown, coached 30 years for the Neville Tigers and compiled a 262–66–5 record with a .790 winning percentage. Coach Brown led the Tigers to eleven district championships and three state championships along with two state runners-up.

 Jimmy Childress - LHSAA Hall of Fame Head Coach, Jimmy Childress, was an assistant football coach at Neville from 1958 to 1972 and helped to deliver four state championships.  

 Mickey McCarty - Coach McCarty, coached 18 years at Neville and compiled a 197–43 record with a .820 winning percentage. He led the Tigers to eleven district championships and four state championships along with two state runners-up.

Baseball
The Neville Tigers baseball team play their home games at Embanato Field and are coached by Head Coach Paul Gurrerieo. The Tigers have won 7 state championships in 10 appearances (1952, 1953, 1954, 1955, 1958, 1961, 1962, 1993, 2012, 2017)

Accolades

In September 2017 Neville High School was recognized as the most beautiful high school in the state of Louisiana by Architectural Digest.  Architectural Digest listed the most beautiful high school in each state of the United States.

Notable alumni

Larry Anderson, former NFL player
Tom Brown, former MLB player (Seattle Mariners)
Bubby Brister - NFL quarterback Pittsburgh Steelers, Philadelphia Eagles, New York Jets, Denver Broncos, and Minnesota Vikings
Joseph S. Cage Jr., former US Attorney for the Western District of Louisiana
Toby Caston, former NFL player
Wayne Causey, former MLB player (Baltimore Orioles, Kansas City Athletics, Chicago White Sox, California Angels, Atlanta Braves)
Detrick DeBurr entrepreneur, author
James L. Dennis,  United States Circuit Judge of the United States Court of Appeals for the Fifth Circuit
John Diarse (Class of 2013), former Denver Broncos wide receiver
Justin Ellis (Class of 2009), defensive tackle for New York Giants
Hugh H. Goodwin (1900-1979), Vice admiral in the Navy
Kay Katz (b. 1938), Republican member of Louisiana House of Representatives
Rashard Lawrence, former player for LSU Tigers football
Alex Presley  (b. 1985, Class of 2003), outfielder for Detroit Tigers
Melvin Rambin, former mayor of Monroe
Barry Rubin (born 1957), Head Strength and Conditioning Coach of the Kansas City Chiefs in the National Football League
Red Swanson, former MLB player (Pittsburgh Pirates)
Marc Swayze, comic book artist
KaVontae Turpin, NFL player

References

External links
 
Neville High School website

Public high schools in Louisiana
Schools in Ouachita Parish, Louisiana
Buildings and structures in Monroe, Louisiana
1931 establishments in Louisiana
Educational institutions established in 1931